American Me is an American metalcore band from Portland, Oregon, whose music also featured elements of various genres of heavy metal and hip hop. The band was formed in 2006 and signed with Rise Records in late 2007.  The band's music is often described as 'brutal hardcore' and is known for its fast pace and heavy sound.

The band's first studio album, Heat, was released in 2008. The album received praise from reviewers for exhibiting a unique, heavier style of hardcore punk, combining hardcore punk and heavy metal with a slight hip hop edge.

History 

American Me was formed in Portland, Oregon in 2006 by high school friends, Tony Tataje and Brian Blade after gaining inspiration from the 1992 film of the same name. Originally, the band was a side-project of melodic hardcore band, It Prevails, although it soon became a full-time band in its own right, distinguished by a far heavier sound.

In November 2009 while touring after the release of their second studio album, Siberian Nightmare Machine, the band's tour trailer was burglarized in Antelope, California causing the loss of their equipment and merchandise which prompted the band's year-long hiatus from the music scene.

After recovering from their robbery and parting ways with hired touring members, the core members re-formed with new drummer, Duncan Allen and released their third studio album, III on August 14, 2012. Later that year, the band embarked on a month-long tour of Europe. In August 2013 the band was added to the "No Way Out Tour" in support of label mates, The Acacia Strain.

One year after their breakup and other projects, the band reformed for their 10-year anniversary tour on August 23–27 with bands Givemblood and CRITIC. They also announced a new EP called Still Firing. The EP was released on November 17, 2017, via Rise Records. Their new music video, "Anti Life Equation", which features AJ Channer of Fire From the Gods, was released on November 15, 2017.

Band members 
Brian Blade – lead guitar (2006–2014, 2017–2018, 2021),  lead vocals (2014)
Cameron Bledsoe – rhythm guitar (2006–2007, 2009–present)
Duncan Allen – drums (2011–2014, 2017–present)
Tony Tataje – lead vocals (2006–2013, 2017–present)
Joseph Manning – bass (2017–present), live rhythm guitar (2013–2014)

Former members 
Phillip Ralston – live guitar (2008–2009)
Scott Walker – drums (2008, 2011)
Charles Nikolet – live drums (2008–2009)
Adam Levesque – live drums (2010–2011)
Jerry Roush – live lead vocals (Japan tour, 2011)
Steve Tinnon – live lead vocals (2010)
Ian Fike – live bass, backing vocals (2006–2008)
Jake Harris – live bass (2006–2008)
Aaron Marsh – drums (2006–2008, 2009–2010)
Doug Funny – bass (2008–2009)
Nate Dorval – live bass, vocals (2008–2009)
Michael Nordeen – live bass (2009–2010)
Pig Tooth – live bass (2010–2011)
Jason Clifford – live bass (2011–2012)

Timeline

Discography 
Studio albums
Heat (2008)
Siberian Nightmare Machine (2009)
III (2012)
EP
"Still Firing EP" (2017)
Demos
Demo/EP (2006)

Videography 
"Back Malicious Lie" (2006)
"Anti-Life Equation" (2017)

Tours 
"Japan Tour" (2011)

References

External links 
 
 American Me statistics and tagging at Last.FM
 

2006 establishments in Oregon
Metalcore musical groups from Oregon
Hardcore punk groups from Oregon
Musical groups from Portland, Oregon
Musical groups established in 2006
Musical quintets